Ornithinibacillus bavariensis is a Gram-positive, aerobic, rod-shaped and motile bacterium from the genus of Ornithinibacillus which has been isolated from pasteurized milk from Bavaria in Germany.

References

External links 

Type strain of Ornithinibacillus bavariensis at BacDive -  the Bacterial Diversity Metadatabase

Bacillaceae
Bacteria described in 2006